Kisbágyon is a village in Nógrád County, Hungary with 417 inhabitants (2014).

Populated places in Nógrád County